This page lists the number of book titles published per country per year from various sources. According to UNESCO, this is an important index of standard of living, education, and of a country's self-awareness. No standardised way to track the number of books published exists which can make it difficult to compare countries or track the industry as a whole. One method is to track how many International Standard Book Numbers (ISBNs) are registered by each country.

List of countries
In descending order of number of new titles per year, as of the latest year available, sometimes "new titles and editions"

TOTAL: approximately 2,210,000

Countries by ISBN 
Many published books have an ISBN and it is a useful measure for how productive a country's publishing industry is. However, this data is not collected for all countries. It may not represent the total number of books a country has published, as not every registered ISBN is then used and as books may have multiple ISBNs.

References

Further reading
Wresch, William. Have and Have-Nots in the Information Age. Rutgers University Press, 1996.

External links
 Fink-Jensen, Jonathan (2015). Book Titles per Capita. (Excel dataset for the period from 1500 until 2010 CE, worldwide)
IPA. "IPA Annual Report 2014", International Publishers Association, retrieved October 25, 2014
Alison Flood. "UK publishes more books per capita than any other country, report shows" The Guardian, retrieved October 25, 2014

 Category:United Nations-related lists

Lists by country
Published Per Country Per Year